Lepidemathis is a spider genus of the jumping spider family, Salticidae. The four described species are endemic to the Philippines.

Species of Lepidemathis look like large editions of the related genus Emathis.

Name
The genus name is a combination of Ancient Greek  "scale" and the related salticid genus Emathis.

Species
As of October 2021, the World Spider Catalog lists the following species in the genus:
 Lepidemathis cavinti Barrion-Dupo & Barrion, 2020 – Philippines (Luzon)
Lepidemathis dogmai Barrion-Dupo & Barrion, 2020 – Philippines (Luzon)
Lepidemathis haemorrhoidalis (Simon, 1899) – Philippines
Lepidemathis lipa Barrion-Dupo & Barrion, 2020 – Philippines (Luzon)
 Lepidemathis luisae Freudenschuss & Seiter, 2016 – Philippines
 Lepidemathis sericea (Simon, 1899) – Philippines
 Lepidemathis unicolor (Karsch, 1880) – Philippines

References

Salticidae genera
Arthropods of the Philippines
Spiders of Asia
Salticidae